KCB Rugby Club is a rugby union team based in Nairobi, Kenya. It was formed in 1989 after the disbanding of Kenya Breweries RFC when their main sponsor, Kenya Breweries, pulled out. That year they joined the Kenya Cup. Their first match was against Impala RFC, whom they beat 96–6. In 1994 the team was relegated to the Eric Shirley Shield, however by 1996 they had regained their position in Kenya's top rugby league. The club now has a 2nd XV team which has performed well, winning the Mwamba Cup, and Eric Shirley Shield several times.

History

The beginning
The history of Kenya Commercial Bank Rugby Football Club cannot be told without that of Kenya Breweries Rugby Football Club, its forerunner. Kenya Breweries RFC was formed in 1983 when a few employees of the parent company Kenya Breweries Limited (KBL) who had played rugby for other clubs felt the need to start their own institutional side. Among the pioneer players were flanker Justus Mugaa M’mpwii who had featured for Mean Machine RFC and Mwamba RFC and the first captain D. Maina who had featured for Impala RFC at fly half.

The first training sessions took place in August 1983 at the Jamhuri High School in Nairobi. Many KBL employees who had never touched a rugby ball in their lives and members of Jamhuri high school rugby team enthusiastically signed up to play for the team. Kenya Breweries RFC played their first ever match, a friendly against Barclays Bank RFC at the RFUEA grounds in October of the same year and made their first competitive appearance at the Jamhuri Sevens in December.

1984 saw the team join the Eric Shirley Shield, the Kenyan second division rugby union league, earning promotion to the first division Kenya Cup in 1987. They would be relegated back to the Eric Shirley Shield in 1988 but returned to the Kenya Cup in 1989. The team received a jolt in February 1989 when the sponsor, KBL announced plans to disband a majority of its sports teams with the exception of its soccer and netball teams.

The aftermath
KBL's decision threw the team into confusion. There were crucial decisions to be made with players wondering whether they would disperse and go their separate ways. A few players ended up at Barclays Bank RFC. Some joined to Mwamba RFC, only to end up at Nondescripts RFC after a short stay. Some players held the view that the KBL players should approach Mwamba RFC where they would be accommodated amicably, while other team members felt that they had built a strong bond that could see them approach institutions for sponsorship as a rugby entity.

Talks were held with many organizations but it was a meeting between hookers Hezekiah Jerome Ougo , Sadik Makii and Patrick Odanga, a former Mwamba and Kenya player who was an employee of Kenya Commercial Bank (KCB) that bore fruit. Further talks followed leading to the formation of Kenya Commercial Bank RFC who were belatedly admitted in the 1989 Kenya Cup to take the place of the now defunct Kenya Breweries RFC.

The club constitutionally changed its name from Kenya Commercial Bank Rugby Football Club (KCB RFC) to Kenya Commercial Bank Rugby Club (KCB RC) at the beginning of the 2010–2011 rugby season. The club dropped the word "Football" from its name after Kenya Rugby Football Union, whom they are affiliated with, dropped theirs in the KRU constitution amended on 15 January 2010 and adopted on 26 February 2010.The constitution was further amended on 28th August 2023 to professionalise  the playing unit and structures of the club

Current squad

1st team squad

 Oscar Sorano
 Peter Kaaria 
 Curtis Lilako. 
 Davis Chenge
 Oliver Mang'eni. 
 Brian Nyikuli
 Andrew Amonde
 Peter Waitere
 Michael Wanjala
 Ken Moseti
 Stafford Abekah
 Brian Omondi
 Peter Kilonzo
 Isaac Njoroge
 Tony Onyango
 Griffin Musila
 Moses Amusala
 Nelson Nyandat. 
 Ian Indimuli
 Rocky Aguko
 Samuel Asati
 Adrian Opondo
 Billy Isabwa

2nd team squad

 Nesta Okotch
 Jerry Olola
 George Gichure
 Dan Othieno
 Brodie Kagai
 Elly Mukaizi
 James Ochieng
 Edwin Otieno
 Marlin Mukolwe
 Stephen Osumba
 Mike Kimwele
 Elphas Adunga
 George Maranga
 Bill Clinton Humwa
 Joshua Mwangi
 Godfrey Otieno
 Mannaseh Oduor
 Calvin Sule
 Ray Lilako
 Paul Ombwayo
 William Kumo
 Collins Wanjala
 Mike Wekesa

Playing kit 

KCB Rugby club playing kit has green as its main color. It is an adaptation from their sponsor, Kenya Commercial Bank, who have light green as one of their corporate colors.

In the early days of the rugby club, the jersey had green, red and white stripes to portray the bank's corporate colors. This was revised and when the bank's corporate identity changed in both logo and color the adaptation was green as the dominant color followed by dark blue and then white.

The second-tier side usually wears kit that is blue dominant in color. They also wear either blue or black shorts unlike the white shorts of the 1st tier side. Currently there is no real distinction in kits between the 1st and 2nd tier sides but, as per club tradition, the new kit of the season is donned by the 1st tier side.

Warm-up jerseys are usually polo neck or round-neck t-shirts provided by Kenya Commercial Bank. The colors vary depending on the product being promoted by the bank's marketing department.

Performance
In 2004 and 2007, they won the Enterprise Cup, they have also won the Kenya Cup 4 times, 3 of them between 2005 and 2007 and one in the 2014–15 season.

This is a summary of the club's performance over the years:

1992
 Kenya Cup 3rd position
 Blackrock Winners
 Christie Sevens Winners
1994
 Relegated from Kenya Cup to Eric Shirley Shield (ESS)
1995
 Eric Shirley Shield Winners (unbeaten and promoted to Kenya Cup)
1996
 Blackrock joint winners with Impala RFC
 Impala Floodlit Runners Up
1999
 Kenya Cup 3rd position
2002
 Kenya Cup Runners Up
 KRFU Fair Play Award Winners
2003
 Kenya Cup 3rd position
 KRFU Chairman's Cup Runners Up
 Impala Floodlit 4th position
2004
 Enterprise Cup Winners
 Kenya Cup Runners Up
 Mwamba Cup Winners
 Eric Shirley Shield Winners
 National 7s Circuit Runner Up
 Participated in Safari 7s
2005
 Kenya Cup Winners
 Impala Floodlit Winners
 Mwamba Cup Winners
2006
 Kenya Cup Winners
 KRFU Chairman's Cup Winners
 Impala Floodlit 3rd position
 Mwamba Cup Winners
2007
 Kenya Cup Winners
 Enterprise Cup Winners
 Impala Floodlit Winners
 Blackrock Winners
2008
 Kenya Cup 3rd position
 KRFU Chairman's Cup Runners Up
 Impala Floodlit 3rd position
 Eric Shirley Shield Winners
2009
 Kenya Cup Runners Up
 Impala Floodlit Runners Up
2010–2011
 Kenya Cup Runners Up
 Impala Floodlit Runners Up
2011–2012
 Kenya Cup 3rd Place
 ESS 3rd Place
 Enterprise Cup Winners
 Mwamba Cup Winners
 Christie Seven's Winners

2012–2013
 Christie 7s, Driftwood 7s Winners
 "One-Night-Stand" Winners
 Chairman's Cup Winners
 Kenya Cup 3rd Place
 National 7s Circuit Runner Up

2013–2014
 Sports Personality of the Year 2014 Award (SOYA) 2nd Runner Up
 Driftwood 7s Winners
 Prinsloo 7s Winners
 Christie 7s Winners
 National 7s Circuit (Safaricom 7s Circuit) Overall Winners
 Safaricom 7s (2013) - Shield Winners
 Impala Floodlit Winners
 Great Rift 10s Winners
 Chairman's Cup Winners
 Mwamba Cup Winners
 Eric Shirley Cup (ESS) Shield Winners
 Kenya Cup Runner Up
 Enterprise Cup Runner Up

2014–2015
 Sports Personality of the Year 2014 Award (SOYA) Winners
 Dala 7s Winners
 Kabeberi 7s Winners
 Driftwood 7s Winners
 National 7s Circuit Winners
 Floodlit Winners
 Kenya Cup Winners
 Enterprise Cup Winners
 ESS Runner Up
 Mwamba Cup Runner Up
 Great Rift 10s Runner Up
 Kakamega 10s Winners

2015–2016
 National 7s Circuit - Ranked 4th
 Floodlit Winners
 Kenya Cup - Ranked 4th
 ESS - Ranked 3rd

See also 
 Kenya Commercial Bank S.C.

References

Sport in Nairobi
Kenyan rugby union teams
Rugby clubs established in 1989
1989 establishments in Kenya